The 1975 Dutch TT was the seventh round of the 1975 Grand Prix motorcycle racing season. It took place on the weekend of 26–28 June 1975 at the Circuit van Drenthe located in Assen, Netherlands.

500cc classification

References

Dutch TT
Dutch
Tourist Trophy